Chakkar is a 2018 Pakistani television comedy drama series written by Rukhsana Nigar that air on 12 December 2018 on Bol Entertainment, directed by Kanwal Khoosat.

Synopsis 
The story is about how a middle-aged woman—whether she is a stepmother or her husband's second wife—copes with her many relations, and who emerges successful in this roundabout of relations.

Cast 
 Faryal Gohar as Kishwar
 Resham as Zeba
 Aamna Malick as Rija
 Zain Afzal as Saad
 Irfan Khoosat as Sajad
 Nargis Rasheed as Nargis
 Omar Cheema as Monty
 Adnan Jehangir
 Saad Khalid
Kiran Shah
Aitzaz Anjum
Jawad Butt
Misbah Butt
Samina Butt
Iram Sana
Shama Rana
Ajmal Deewan
Qaiser Latif
 Sania Saeed as Razia (guest appearance)

References

External links
 

2018 Pakistani television series debuts
Pakistani drama television series
Urdu-language television shows